Wade Kaulana Domonic Keliikipi (pronounced kay-lee-ee-KEE-pee; born July 21, 1991) is an American football nose tackle who is currently a free agent. He was an undrafted free agent by the Philadelphia Eagles in 2014. He played college football at Oregon.

College career
Keliikipi studied general social science at the University of Oregon. He twice received honorable mentions for the  All-Pac-12 team. He was a part of three winning bowls with Oregon: 2012 Rose Bowl over Wisconsin, 2013 Fiesta Bowl over 2012 Kansas State, and 2013 Alamo Bowl over Texas.

Professional career
On May 10, 2014, Keliikipi was signed by the Philadelphia Eagles as an undrafted free agent. On August 30, 2014, Keliikipi was waived by the Eagles. On August 31, 2014, he was signed to the practice squad. On December 30, 2014, he was signed a future contract. On August 24, 2015, Keliikipi was waived by the Eagles. On August 25, 2015, he was placed on injured reserve list. On November 16, 2015, Keliikipi was waived from injured reserve list.

Personal life
Keliikipi grew up in the town of Waianae, Hawaii, and played football at Waianae High School. He is the son of West and Gloria Keliikipi. His two brothers, West III and Winston, played football at the University of Hawaii. He is married to Brendorcha Keliikipi.

References

External links
 Oregon Ducks bio

1991 births
Living people
American football defensive tackles
Oregon Ducks football players
Philadelphia Eagles players
People from Honolulu County, Hawaii